Comaster nobilis, the noble/yellow feather star, is a crinoid in the family Comatulidae. It was previously classified as Comanthina nobilis but further research showed that it was better placed in the genus Comaster.

Description 
It has a cup-shaped body with 35-40 arms, extended out from the central disc. This species may occur in a number of colour variations. Usually it has yellow arms, sometimes with some black or green and white on the under surface close to the centre. It feeds on detritus, fitoplancton and zooplancton. The larvae of this feather star swim freely with plankton for a few weeks, then they settle down growing into a stalked form. Mature specimen break the stalk becoming free-living.

Distribution
This species is widespread in the Indo-Pacific, from Coral Sea and  Great Barrier Reef up to Indonesia, Malaysia, New Caledonia and Philippines.

Habitat
It is found on hard or soft corals in shallow water reefs, at a depth of  10 – 50 m.

References 
 WoRMS
 EoL
 Bardode of Life
 Wild Singapore
 Shimek, R. L. (2004). Marine Invertebrates: Introduction to Feather Stars or Crinoids. TFH Publications. pp. 364–366

External links
 Dive Planet
 Spineless

Animals described in 1884
Comatulidae